In model theory, a field within mathematical logic, the Ehrenfeucht–Mostowski theorem  gives conditions for the existence of a model with indiscernibles.

Statement
A linearly ordered set X is called a set of indiscernibles of a model if the truth of a statement about elements of X depends only on their order.

The Ehrenfeucht–Mostowski theorem states that 
if T is a theory with an infinite model, then there is a model of T containing any given linearly ordered set X as a set of indiscernibles.

The proof uses Ramsey's theorem.

Applications
The Ehrenfeucht–Mostowski is used to construct models with many automorphisms. It is also used in the theory of zero sharp to construct indiscernibles in the constructible universe.

References

Model theory